Eva Luna is a novel by Isabel Allende.

Eva Luna may also refer to:

 Eva Luna (horse), an Irish racehorse
 Eva Luna (TV series), a 2010 telenovela